Pentridge is a village and former civil parish, now in the parish of Sixpenny Handley and Pentridge, in the English county of Dorset, lying in the north-east of the county within the East Dorset administrative district. It is situated on the edge of Cranborne Chase down a dead-end minor lane just south of the A354 road between the towns of Blandford Forum (ten miles to the south-west) and  Salisbury (twelve miles to the northeast). In 2001 it had a population of 215. The civil parish was abolished on 1 April 2015 and merged with Sixpenny Handley to form Sixpenny Handley and Pentridge.

The village name derives from the Celtic pen ("hill") and twrch ("boar"), and thus means "hill of the wild boar"; its existence was first recorded (as "Pentric") in the eighth century, eighty years before the birth of Alfred the Great.

The village is located amongst many Neolithic, Roman and Saxon earthworks, notably Bokerley Dyke, a long defensive ditch which was dug by the Romano-British to keep out the Saxon invaders.

Nearby is Pentridge Hill, formed by a band of more resistant chalk than the surrounding land.

References

External links

 Census data

Villages in Dorset
Former civil parishes in Dorset
East Dorset District
Populated places disestablished in 2015